Winifred Cooper was a British film editor known for her work on films like They Met in the Dark and Hitchcock's Rich and Strange.

Selected filmography 

 Candlelight in Algeria (1944)
 They Met in the Dark (1943)
 At Dawn We Die (1943)
 Torpedoed (1937)
 Two Who Dared (1936)
 Bill and Coo (1931)
 East of Shanghai (1931)
 The Outsider (1931)

References

External links 

 

British film editors
British women film editors
Year of birth missing
Year of death missing